Singapore Post Limited, commonly abbreviated as SingPost, is an associate company of Singtel and Singapore's designated Public Postal Licensee which provides domestic and international postal services.

It also provides logistics services in the domestic market and global delivery services. SingPost also offers products and services including postal, agency and financial services through its post offices, Self-service Automated Machines (SAMs) and vPOST, its internet portal. Its headquarters is located in Paya Lebar, Singapore.

Today, Singapore has 57 post offices, 1 Self-service post office, 299 Self-service Automated Machines (SAMs) and SAMPLUS, around 40 postal agencies and more than 800 licensed stamp vendors.  There are also 8,907 posting boxes are installed at various locations throughout the island.

History

Early history

Postal Services were available in Singapore since the island was founded by Sir Stamford Raffles in 1819.  Initially, mail services were handled by the military authorities and then by the Master Attendant in 1823.  The volume of mail was very small in those days and letters were collected and delivered from a single mail office.  The Post Office, as it was then known, shared a room with the Master Attendant's Marine Office and the clerk to the Registrar of Import and Export.  The whole establishment of the post office in the 1830s consisted of one European clerk, one local writer and a peon.

To cope with the increasing volume of mail, the Post Office, then known as the Singapore Post Office, later General Post Office, was moved in 1854 to its own building near the Town Hall by the side of the Singapore River.  Although it was more spacious, there were frequent complaints regarding its location.  The Commercial Square (business sector) was on the opposite side of the river, so going to the Post office was inconvenient as one had to cross the river by boat. After 1856, a footbridge was constructed across the river and a toll of  cent was levied.

As trade flourished in Singapore and both postal and marine traffic grew heavier, the Post Office was separated from the Marine Office and it became a separate department in October 1858.  During the period 1819 and 1858, letters for posting had to be handed in at the Post Office.  No postage stamps were used but a register was kept of all letters received at the Post Office and of the names of sailing ships on which they were conveyed.

Stamped receipts were also given for all letters sent to the Post Office for dispatch.  For the convenience of the residents, a register was kept of their individual postage accounts on the understanding that all postage due would be regularly settled every month.  The first postage stamps were introduced for payment of postage only in 1854.  In the early days, the flagstaff at Government Hill (now Fort Canning) was eagerly watched as flying of a flag at daylight, or the firing of a gun at night, signified the arrival of a ship with mail.  This infused new life into the quiet community.

On receipt of letters from incoming ships, the Post Office sorters would proceed to register alphabetically all the letters before sending them out through the postmen for delivery.  Postal delivery services by means of bullock cart, horse carriage or on foot, were first restricted to the town area.  Posting boxes were later installed in the town area for the posting of mail which were then collected by horse-drawn mail coaches.

In 1873, a new General Post office was built on the site of the former Fort Fullerton, a location which was much nearer to the commercial centre of the town.  However, the British Government failed to foresee the needs of the future, with the result that the building had to be replaced by another on practically the same site.  The new General Post Office was completed in 1885, three years after approval was obtained.

The General Post Office was closed on 23 April 1921.  All the equipment were moved to a building on the recently reclaimed land at Collyer Quay, and staff worked at this temporary post office during the construction of Fullerton Building.  The post office was transferred back to Fullerton Building on 23 July 1928 and has remained there since.

The latter part of the 19th century marked the modern phase of the development in the history of the Singapore postal service.  Services were extended to include a parcel post service, money order and postal order services and a post office savings bank.  1897 saw the establishment of the first sub-post offices, and by 1938, some 20 sub-post offices were already providing decentralised postal facilities on the island.  The horse-drawn mail coaches were withdrawn and replaced by motor vans in 1914 as the mail traffic handled steadily increased.

Modern history

In 1982, the Postal Services Department merged with Telecommunication Authority of Singapore, also known as Telecoms.

In 1992, Telecoms was split into three entities, the reconstituted Telecommunication Authority of Singapore (TAS), Singapore Telecommunications Limited and Singapore Post Private Limited, an associated company of Singapore Telecommunications.

Singapore Post Limited was then incorporated on 28 March and then listed on the mainboard of the Singapore Exchange (SGX-ST) on 13 May 2003. It was then granted the first Public Postal License by TAS. As a licensee, Singapore Post is allowed to operate postal services - receiving, collecting and delivering letters and postcards from one place to another until 31 March 2037.

SingPost was fined S$100,000 in 2017 and S$300,000 in 2018 for failing to meet mail delivery standards by IMDA.

Mobile post office 
The Mobile Post Office was introduced in November 1952 and was operated by Postal Services Department. It provided on-the-spot postal services to residents living in rural areas where there were no post offices. The vans followed fixed routes and time schedules which were announced in the newspapers and each visit only lasted about one to two hours. As more postal facilities were set up across the island, the mobile post offices were no longer needed to serve customers in rural areas and were eventually withdrawn from service in 1980.

Growth
SingPost has made several acquisitions to strengthen and grow its business. In 2009, it acquired the remaining 50% stake in G3 Worldwide Aspac (G3AP), thereby giving the company presence in 10 countries (including Singapore). It also raised its stake in Malaysian Logistics company GDEX to 27% in 2011.

Alibaba bought a 10.35% stake in SingPost for S$312.5 million in May 2014. Both parties also signed an agreement to pursue a joint venture in the business of e-commerce logistics.

In October 2015, SingPost acquired a 96.3 per cent stake in TradeGlobal for US$168.6 million (S$210 million), thereby expanding its e-commerce footprint in the United States. SingPost also trialed a drone delivery system, using a commercial drone modified by a joint team from SingPost and Infocomm Development Authority Labs.

See also
Postage stamps and postal history of Singapore
Postal codes in Singapore

References

External links
Singapore Post Limited official website

Postal organizations
Logistics companies of Singapore
Postal system of Singapore
Organizations established in 1819
Singaporean brands
Philately of Singapore
Government-owned companies of Singapore
Companies listed on the Singapore Exchange